Letheobia rufescens, also known as the Oubangui gracile blind snake or Haut-Oubangui beaked snake, is a species of snake in the family Typhlopidae. It is endemic to Central Africa (Central African Republic and northern Democratic Republic of the Congo).

References

Further reading
 Chabanaud, P. 1916. Énumération des Ophidiens non encore étudiés de l'Afrique occidentale, appartenent aux Collections de Muséum, avec la description des espèces et des variétés nouvelles. Bulletin du Muséum national d'histoire naturelle. Volume 22, pp. 362–382.

Letheobia
Snakes of Africa
Reptiles of the Central African Republic
Reptiles of the Democratic Republic of the Congo
Reptiles described in 1916
Taxa named by Paul Chabanaud